The 2013 Croatian Football Super Cup was the tenth edition of the Croatian Football Super Cup, a football match contested by the winners of the previous season's Croatian First League and Croatian Football Cup competitions. The match was played on 6 July 2013 at Stadion Maksimir between 2012–13 Croatian First League winners Dinamo Zagreb and 2012–13 Croatian Football Cup winners Hajduk Split.

Match details

References 

 2013 Croatian Football Super Cup at HRnogomet.com

2013
GNK Dinamo Zagreb matches
HNK Hajduk Split matches
Association football penalty shoot-outs
Supercup